Sõrve is a village in Harku Parish, Harju County in northern Estonia. It has a population of 197 (as of 1 June 2010).

Sõrve was first mentioned in 1241 as Serueueræ village in the Danish Census Book.

References

Villages in Harju County